The Judo Union of Asia (JUA) is the governing body of judo in Asia. It is one of the five continental confederations making up the International Judo Federation (IJF). JUA was formed in 1956 in Tokyo (Japan), with Chinese Taipei, Cambodia, Indonesia, Japan, South Korea, Philippines and Thailand being the founder members. JUA has headquarters in Kuwait and consists of 39 member federations.

History
Judo Union of Asia (JUA) was established in 1956 in Tokyo, Japan with 7 national federations as founding members; Chinese Taipei, Cambodia, Indonesia, Japan, South Korea, Philippines and Thailand. The first President of JUA was Risei Kano, son of Kanō Jigorō. Risei Kano served as President of the JUA from 1956 to 1980. The organization held the first Asian Judo Championships in 1966 in Manila, Philippines, with teams from 8 member federations participating.

Executive committee
Following is the JUA Executive Committee for the term 2019 – 2023.

Tournaments
 Asian Judo Championships
 Asian Games
 East Asian Judo Championships
 Asian Martial Arts Games

Members
Central Zone

 Kazakhstan
 Kyrgyzstan
 Tajikistan
 Turkmenistan
 Uzbekistan

Southeast Zone

 Cambodia
 Indonesia
 Lao
 Malaysia
 Myanmar
 Philippines
 Singapore
 Thailand
 Vietnam

East Zone

 P. R. China
 Chinese Taipei
 DPR Korea
 Hong Kong, China
 Japan
 Republic of Korea
 Macau, China
 Mongolia

West Zone

 I. R. Iran
 Iraq
 Jordan
 Kuwait
 Lebanon
 Palestine
 Qatar
 Saudi Arabia
 Syria
 United Arab Emirates

Central Zone

 Bangladesh
 India
 Nepal
 Sri Lanka
 Afghanistan
 Pakistan
 Bhutan

Non-Members

 Iran Judo Federation was suspended by International Judo Federation since 18 September 2019, as Iranian authorities ordered their judoka Saeid Mollaei to intentionally lose in the semi-final at the 2019 World Judo Championships, so as to avoid a potential match in the finals against Israeli judoka Sagi Muki.

References

External links
  

Asia
Sports governing bodies in Asia
Union
Sports organizations established in 1956
1956 establishments in Asia